Samuel Lester "Slam" Agnew (April 12, 1887 – July 19, 1951) was an American professional baseball catcher. He played in Major League Baseball from 1913 through 1919 for the St. Louis Browns, Boston Red Sox and Washington Senators. Agnew batted and threw right-handed.

Life

He was born in Farmington, Missouri on 12 April 1887.

Agnew debuted with the St. Louis Browns on April 10, . In 105 games his rookie season, Sam hit .208 with 2 home runs and 24 RBI, stealing 11 bases, in 307 at bats. In , Agnew hit .212 with 16 RBI in 115 games. That season he finished 23rd in the balloting for Most Valuable Player, losing out to Eddie Collins of the Philadelphia Athletics. In , he slipped down to a .203 average with 19 RBI in 104 games.

On December 16, the Boston Red Sox purchased Agnew from the St. Louis Browns. Serving as the backup to regular backstop Pinch Thomas, Agnew hit .209 (14-for-67) with 7 RBI in 40 games. During a late season Red Sox game, a fight broke out after Carl Mays hit a Washington player with a pitch. The benches emptied and subsequently Agnew punched out Senators manager Clark Griffith. Agnew was arrested and was suspended by the American League President for five days.

His offensive woes continued during the 1918 World Series, as he went hitless in nine at bats over four games against the Chicago Cubs.

In January , Agnew was purchased from the Boston Red Sox by the Washington Senators. In just 42 games, Agnew hit a career-high .235 with 10 RBI. He played his final major league game on September 28, 1919. After his playing career, he went on to become a pitching coach for the Cubs and also a minor league coach.

In a seven-season career, Agnew posted a .204 batting average with two home runs and 98 RBI in 563 games played. Agnew died in Sonoma, California, at the age of 64.

After his Major League career ended, he continued to play in the minor leagues with the San Francisco Seals and Hollywood Stars of the Pacific Coast League until 1929.

He was later a manager in the minors for the San Diego Aces of the California State League (1929), Augusta Wolves of the South Atlantic League (1930 & 1938) and Palatka Azaleas of the Florida State League (1937).

He died on 19 July 1951 and is buried in the Chapel of the Chimes in Santa Rosa, California.

Family

His brother was Troy Agnew.

References

External links

1887 births
1951 deaths
Major League Baseball catchers
Boston Red Sox players
St. Louis Browns players
Washington Senators (1901–1960) players
Santa Clara Broncos baseball coaches
Minor league baseball managers
Topeka Jayhawks players
Omaha Rourkes players
Vernon Tigers players
San Francisco Seals (baseball) players
Hollywood Stars players
San Diego Aces players
People from Farmington, Missouri
Baseball players from Missouri